Cheshmeh Kabud (also Romanized as Cheshmeh Kabūd) is a village in Mansuri Rural District, Homeyl District, Eslamabad-e Gharb County, Kermanshah Province, Iran. At the 2006 census, its population was 257, in 61 families.

References 

Populated places in Eslamabad-e Gharb County